Eskelinen is a Finnish surname. Notable people with the surname include:

 August Eskelinen (1898–1987), Finnish biathlete
 Kaj Eskelinen (born 1969), Swedish footballer of Finnish descent
 Kalevi Eskelinen (born 1945), Finnish racing cyclist
 Katri-Helena Eskelinen (1925–2014), FInnish politician
 Kimmo Eskelinen (born 1983), Swedish floorball player
 Rami Eskelinen (born 1967), Finnish jazz drummer
 Seppo Eskelinen (born 1960), Finnish politician
 Toni Eskelinen (born 1995), Finnish ice hockey goaltender

References

Finnish-language surnames